Jean-Jacques N'Domba nicknamed Géomètre (born June 12, 1960 in Pointe-Noire, Republic of the Congo) is a former professional footballer who played as a midfielder.

External links
 
 Jean-Jacques N'Domba profile at chamoisfc79.fr

1979 births
Living people
Republic of the Congo expatriate footballers
Republic of the Congo footballers
Republic of the Congo international footballers
1978 African Cup of Nations players
1992 African Cup of Nations players
Association football midfielders
Olympique de Marseille players
Le Puy Foot 43 Auvergne players
Olympique Lyonnais players
Chamois Niortais F.C. players
Stade Poitevin FC players
Ligue 2 players
Expatriate footballers in France
Republic of the Congo expatriate sportspeople in France